Vincent Paul Kartheiser (born May 5, 1979) is an American actor. He played Pete Campbell on the AMC television series Mad Men, for which he received six Screen Actors Guild Award nominations for Outstanding Performance by an Ensemble in a Drama Series and won twice along with the cast. He had starring roles in the films Alaska, Masterminds, and Another Day in Paradise. 

Kartheiser also played Connor on The WB television series Angel and Dr. Jonathan Crane in the third season of the HBO series Titans.

Early life
Kartheiser was born in Minneapolis, Minnesota, the son of Janet Marie (née Gruyé), who ran a nursery, and James Ralph Kartheiser, who sold construction equipment.

The youngest of six children, he has four sisters, Andrea, Colette, Elise and Theresa, and a brother, Nathan. He is of Luxembourgish, German, and to an extent Polish, Finnish, and Swedish ancestry. Kartheiser attended Apple Valley High School in Apple Valley, Minnesota, but dropped out at age 15 because he "wanted to make money."

Career
Some of Kartheiser's first acting experiences were on stage of Children's Theatre Company in Minneapolis, including roles in Pippi Longstocking, Our Town, Dr. Seuss' The 500 Hats of Bartholomew Cubbins, and Rebecca of Sunnybrook Farm.

He made his screen debut with a bit role in the 1993 film Untamed Heart. Kartheiser found himself cast in mostly family fare, including The Indian in the Cupboard (1995) and a starring role in the film Alaska (1996). The film led to Kartheiser getting the lead role in Masterminds the following year.

He was next cast as Bobby, a drug-addicted, homeless street urchin in Larry Clark's Another Day in Paradise. He had two explicit sex scenes with Natasha Gregson, one of which was cut from the film in order to avoid an NC-17 rating. The film earned the young actor significant accolades, and he went on to appear in Strike! (later retitled All I Wanna Do) and Crime and Punishment in Suburbia.

Screened at the 2000 Sundance Film Festival, Crime and Punishment in Suburbia was a moody, updated take on Dostoyevsky's Crime and Punishment, set in a modern high school. Kartheiser co-starred on the supernatural drama series Angel in 2002, playing Connor, the son of the title character Angel, appearing in a total of 28 episodes. Returning to film work, Kartheiser starred in the well-received coming-of-age drama Dandelion, which was shown at the 2004 Sundance Film Festival.

Kartheiser played the role of ambitious young ad man Pete Campbell in the AMC television series Mad Men (2007–2015). Along with the rest of the show's cast, Kartheiser won the Screen Actors Guild Award for Outstanding Performance by an Ensemble in a Drama Series in 2009 and 2010.

Kartheiser filmed his role as Fielding in the BBC's two-part adaptation of Martin Amis' novel Money in the winter of 2009. The adaptation began airing on BBC Two on May 23, 2010. In 2011, he appeared in In Time and provided a voice for Rango.

Kartheiser's short film, Fruit of Labor, made its Orange County debut at the Newport Beach Film Festival in April 2013. In the summer of 2013, he returned to his theatrical roots in Minneapolis to portray Mr. Darcy in an adaptation of Pride and Prejudice at the Guthrie Theater.

In 2021, Kartheiser appeared in season three of Titans as Jonathan Crane. Kartheiser was the subject of at least two complaints and two internal investigations by Warner Bros Television over allegations of disruptive, juvenile behavior and inappropriate comments on set. The first investigation concluded that Kartheiser's behavior warranted corrective action. The second complaint was received several weeks later and resulted in the studio assigning a representative to monitor Kartheiser on set. There were reportedly other complaints of alleged misconduct which were investigated but not corroborated. Kartheiser denied the allegations, with his spokesperson stating, "Warner Bros investigated this matter and made clear to Mr. Kartheiser its expectations for behavior on the set, and he agreed to comply with their directives."

Personal life
Kartheiser dated The Hairy Bird co-star Rachael Leigh Cook for four months in 1998. He began dating actress Alexis Bledel in mid-2012. He and Bledel announced their engagement in March 2013, and were married in California in June 2014. They have one son, born in 2015. The couple sold their Brooklyn duplex penthouse for $1.32 million in May 2016. On August 10, 2022, Kartheiser filed for divorce from Bledel; the divorce was finalized on August 26.

In a 2010 interview with The Observer, Kartheiser revealed that he eschewed the extravagant lifestyle of a Hollywood celebrity in favor of simple living.

Filmography

Film

Television

Video game

References

External links

 

1979 births
20th-century American male actors
21st-century American male actors
American environmentalists
American male child actors
American male film actors
American male television actors
American people of Finnish descent
American people of German descent
American people of Luxembourgian descent
American people of Polish descent
American people of Swedish descent
Living people
Male actors from Minneapolis
People from Brooklyn Heights
Apple Valley High School (Minnesota) alumni